Rainer Schönfelder (born 13 June 1977) is an Austrian former skier who won the 2003–2004 men's World Cup slalom title.

Career
Born in Bleiburg, Carinthia, Austria, Schönfelder made his debut in the 1995–1996 season, finishing 115th in the overall rankings. He quickly began to excel in the slalom events, and improved his position in the overall World Cup standing to 10th place by the 2003–2004 season.

Apart from his slalom success in the 2003–2004 World Cup, his other achievements include 2 bronze medals (combined and slalom) at the 2006 Winter Olympics in Torino, Italy and a 4th place in the combined event at the 2002 Winter Olympics in Salt Lake City.

On 27 March 2004, Schönfelder tested positive for the stimulant Etilephrine at the Austrian slalom championships. However, he was not banned and continued competing in 2004–05, since it was found that he had taken the substance inadvertently while undergoing treatment of influenza.

Rainer Schönfelder has also had some success as a pop singer in Austria, especially with a cover version of Wolfgang Ambros' classic hit "Schifoan" (meaning "skiing").

Schönfelder made headlines on 10 January 2007 by skiing nude after losing a bet with his physiotherapist.

Trivia 

Before the race in Chamonix Schönfelder slipped in the bathroom and got a contusion on his testicles.

World Cup results

Overall

Individual victories

Season standings

References

External links
 

1977 births
Living people
Austrian male alpine skiers
Alpine skiers at the 2002 Winter Olympics
Alpine skiers at the 2006 Winter Olympics
Olympic bronze medalists for Austria
Olympic alpine skiers of Austria
Olympic medalists in alpine skiing
FIS Alpine Ski World Cup champions
Medalists at the 2006 Winter Olympics
Sportspeople from Carinthia (state)